Forever Scorned is the debut EP released by the metalcore band It Dies Today in 2002.  It was recorded, mixed, and mastered in May 2002 at Watchmen Recording Studios.  It was rerecorded and re-released in 2005 with a different cover.

Track listing
 "Sentiments of You" - 4:37
 "Bridges Left Burning" - 4:08
 "The Requiem for Broken Hearts" - 5:38
 "Forever Scorned" - 3:55
 "Blood Stained Bed Sheet Burden" - 5:32
 "A Romance by the Wings of Icarus" - 5:31

Personnel
Nick Brooks- vocals
Chris Cappelli- guitar
Steve Lemke- guitar
Seth Thompson- bass
Jimmy Revson- drums
Adam Stankiewicz- keyboards on "Sentiments of You"

It Dies Today albums
2002 debut EPs
Albums recorded at Watchmen Recording Studios